The 2013 Kroger 200 was a NASCAR Camping World Truck Series race held on October 26, 2013 at Martinsville Speedway in Ridgeway, Virginia. Contested over 200 laps, the race was the nineteenth of the 2013 season. Bubba Wallace of Kyle Busch Motorsports won the race. Brendan Gaughan finished second and Jeb Burton finished third.

Race
Bubba Wallace led 96 laps in winning the race, becoming the first African American driver to win in the Camping World Truck Series, and the first African American driver to win in a NASCAR national touring series since Wendell Scott won a Grand National Series race, the 1964 Jacksonville 200, at Speedway Park in Jacksonville on December 1, 1963.

Results

Standings after the race

Source:

References

Kroger 200
Kroger 200
NASCAR races at Martinsville Speedway